Maud de Belleroche (nee Madeleine Sacquard, 26 August 1922 – 19 February 2017) was a French writer, author of the 1968 best-seller L'Ordinatrice and winner of the 1963 Prix Broquette-Gonin for Cinq personnages en quête d’empereur.

Filmography 
 1969 : The Seducers (as Mudy)

Bibliography 
 Cinq personnages en quête d’empereur (1962)
 Du dandy au play-boy (1965)
 L'Ordinatrice ? Mémoires d'une femme de quarante ans (1968)
 L'Ordinatrice seconde (1969)
 Des femmes (1970)
 Noisette (1971)
 Eva Perón. La reine des sans chemises (1972)
 Le Ballet des crabes (1975)
 La Murène apprivoisée (1980)
 Oscar Wilde ou l'amour qui n'ose dire son nom, preface of Alain Peyrefitte (1987)
 Sacha Guitry ou l'esprit français (2007)

Honours and awards 
 Prix Broquette-Gonin for Cinq personnages en quête d'empereur in 1963

References 

1922 births
2017 deaths
20th-century French novelists
20th-century French women writers
21st-century French novelists
21st-century French women writers
Writers from Paris